Georges Politzer (3 May 190323 May 1942) was a French philosopher and Marxist theoretician of Hungarian Jewish origin, affectionately referred to by some as the "red-headed philosopher" (philosophe roux).  He was a native of Oradea, a city in present-day Romania (then Nagyvárad, Hungary). He was murdered in the Holocaust.

Biography
Politzer was already a militant by the time of his involvement in the Hungarian insurrection of 1919 at age seventeen during the Hungarian Soviet Republic led by Béla Kun. He went into exile during the White Terror that preceded the establishment of a right-wing government under the regency of Admiral Miklós Horthy.

After meeting Freud and Sándor Ferenczi in Vienna, he settled in Paris in 1921. He joined the French Communist Party between 1929 and 1931.

At the beginning of the 1930s, the Communist Party founded the Workers University of Paris (l'Université Ouvrière de Paris) which lasted until dissolution by German occupation in 1939. During his tenure at the university, Politzer was entrusted with and given charge of a course on dialectical materialism.

In this same period, he occupied the post of professor of philosophy at Lycée Marcelin Berthelot in Saint-Maur-des-Fossés.

Mobilized to Paris in 1940, he remained on the side of the French Communist Party secret command. Demobilized in July 1940, he oversaw the edition of a clandestine bulletin. After his comrade and friend Paul Langevin, a physicist of world renown, was arrested in October 1940, Politzer published the first edition of The Free University (L'Université Libre), which told of the imprisonment of scholars and denounced the extortions committed by invading fascists during World War II. He worked with other writers like Jacques Decour, Jacques Solomon or Valentin Feldman. All were executed by the nazis in 1942.

In February 1942, Politzer's operations were stopped; he was arrested along with his wife Mai (also a Communist and a Resister) for violating the law banning the Communist Party. He underwent torture, being turned over to the Nazis on 20 March 1942 and undergoing execution by firing squad at their hands on 23 May of that year, just after having secretly published a French academic journal. His wife was transported to Auschwitz, where she was murdered in March 1943.

Contribution to philosophy
A disciple of Marx and Lenin, Politzer was very interested in psychology, preaching the concrete aspects of this field, in relation to which he qualified traditional psychology as abstract. 
He also took a lively interest in nascent Freudian theory and its uses before eventually distancing himself from it.
His posthumous work, Elementary Principles of Philosophy (Principes Élémentaires de Philosophie) based on notes taken by his followers, was the first work banned by the fascist military regime established in Turkey in 1980.

Quotations

As much as one might say: there are, in the history of philosophy, philosophies without subject and philosophies which exhaust themselves in a debauchery of honest or pharisean artifice, with perfect unawareness of being without substance, one will not discuss more than the dates; as much as one might say: the rebirths of the spirit correspond to the discovery of a new subject and the nuances are then swept away because one poses problems in grander terms; they will congratulate us on the ingeniousness of our designs.  But when one will say: forthwith, the problems will be posed in great terms; forthwith, the nuances will be swept away, because we see here the new substance: from here on we will not be more than the simple-minded and ignorant and as part of the bargain, ranters ; And all the good disposition that one could have for our ideas will evaporate, suddenly, from the mere fact that we want to convey the precision that they entail.  For that is the law of the situation.  The philosophers of philosophy without substance are unaware and the comedy brought to bear on them is that they know from science certain that they have had philosophers unaware of being without substance, and that they are perfectly incapable of diagnosing in themselves the ills that they recognize in others.

Tant qu'on dira: il y a dans l'histoire de la philosophie des philosophies sans matière et des philosophies s'épuisant dans une débauche d'artifices honnêtes ou pharisiens, avec l'inconscience parfaite d'être privés de matière, on ne discutera plus que sur les dates; tant qu'on dira : les renaissances de l'esprit correspondent à la découverte d'une matière nouvelle et les nuances sont alors balayées parce qu'on pose les problèmes en grands termes, ils nous féliciteront de l'ingéniosité de nos vues. Mais quand on dira : il faut que dès maintenant les problèmes soient posés en grands termes; il faut que dès maintenant les nuances soient balayées, car voici la matière nouvelle: alors nous ne seront plus que des simplistes et des ignorants et par-dessus le marché, des énergumènes. Et toute la bonne disposition qu'on pouvait avoir pour nos idées s'évaporera, tout de suite, du seul fait que nous voulons leur donner la précision qu'elles comportent. Car telle est la loi de la situation. Les philosophes de la philosophie sans matière sont inconscients et le comique qui pèse sur eux c'est qu'ils savent de science certaine qu'il y a eu des philosophes inconscients d'être privés de matière et qu'ils sont parfaitement impuissants à diagnostiquer chez eux la maladie qu'ils reconnaissent pourtant chez les autres.   -drawn from The Mind (L'Esprit), Notebooks (Cahiers), May 1926

Supporters posit that all that was new, upsetting the house of Politzer, has been repudiated, ridiculed; and all of that was not upsetting to the official dominant philosophy has been favored.

And it is necessary to acknowledge that, for the new philosophy, there can not be dualism between certainty and security, since speculations connect those who extol it to those who one calls the enemies of society.  And they find themselves therefore, happily, in discord with the state.  The new philosophers will have nothing more than mere certainty.  Truly, philosophying will become anew a dangerous occupation, as it was in heroic times.  The philosophers will anew be the friends of the truth, but by the same turn, enemies of the gods, enemies of the state, and corrupters of youth.  Philosophy will, anew, involve a risk.  A selection will then take place. The truth will be achieved only by those who love it to the point of daring to transform spiritual ventures into material ones.

Et il faut avouer que, pour la philosophie nouvelle, il ne peut pas y avoir de dualisme entre la certitude et la sécurité, puisque les spéculations rattachent ceux qui la préconisent  à ceux qu'on appelle les ennemis de la société. Et se trouvant ainsi, heureusement, en désaccord avec l'État, les nouveaux philosophes n'auront plus que la certitude. Philosopher véritablement sera de nouveau une occupation dangereuse comme dans les temps héroïques. Les philosophes seront de nouveau amis de la vérité, mais par là même ennemis des dieux, ennemis de l'État et corrupteurs de la jeunesse. La philosophie comportera de nouveau un risque. Une sélection se produira donc. Ne viendront à la vérité que ceux qui l'aiment au point d'oser transformer les aventures spirituelles en aventures matérielles.  -(ibidem)

See also
 Jacques Solomon
 Jacques Decour
 Valentin Feldman
 Paul Langevin
 Charlotte Delbo
 List of Holocaust victims

Notes
 -  des énergumènes, per the translation source

Works

 Against Bergson and some other writers, Philosophical Writings (Contre Bergson et quelques autres), 1924-1939
 Philosophical Investigations into the Essence of Human Freedom, French translation of Schelling, 1926
 Critique of the Foundations of Psychology (Critique des Fondements de la Psychologie), 1928
 Bergsonism, a Philosophical Hoax (La fin d'une parade philosophique: Le bergsonisme), 1929, under the name of François Arouet
 The Great Problems of Contemporary Philosophy (Les Grands Problèmes de la Philosophie Contemporaine), 1938
 Philosophy and Myths (La Philosophie et les Mythes), 1939
 Philosophy of the Enlightment and Modern Thought (La Philosophie des Lumières et la Pensée moderne), 1939
 What is Rationalism? (Qu'est-ce que le rationalisme?), 1939
 The End of Psychoanalysis (La Fin de la Psychanalyse), 1939
 In the Cellar of the Blind, Chronicles on Nowadays Obscurantism (Dans la cave de l'aveugle, chronique de l'obscurantisme contemporain), 1939
 Blood and Gold (Sang et Or) or Gold Vanquished by Blood (L'Or Vaincu par le Sang), November 1940
 Revolution and Counter-revolution in the 20th Century (Révolution et Contre-révolution au XXè Siècle), Éditions Sociales, March 1941
 Antisemitism, Racism and the Jewish Problem (L'antisémitisme, le racisme, le problème juif), 1941
 Obscurantism in the 20th century (L'Obscurantisme au 20ème siècle), 1941
 A Course on Marxism (Cours de Marxisme), 1935-1936
 Elementary Principles of Philosophy (Principes Élémentaires de Philosophie), 1946, notes taken in the course taught at l'Université Ouvrière from 1935 to 1936
 Crisis of Nowadays Psychology (La Crise de la Psychologie contemporaine), 1947
 Foundamental Principles of Philosophy (Principes Fondamentaux de Philosophie), edited by Guy Besse and Maurice Caveing, 1954
 Writings 1 Philosophy and Myths (Écrits 1 La Philosophie et les Mythes), Éditions Sociales, 1973
 Writings 2 The Foundations of Psychology (Écrits 2 Les Fondements de la Psychologie), Éditions Sociales

References 
 Biography
 Works

External links

 

1903 births
1942 deaths
People from Oradea
French political philosophers
Marxist theorists
French Marxists
20th-century Hungarian Jews
Jews in the French resistance
Jewish philosophers
Jewish socialists
Continental philosophers
20th-century French philosophers
Communist members of the French Resistance
World War II resistance press activists
Resistance members killed by Nazi Germany
Executed Hungarian people
People executed by Nazi Germany by firing squad
French people executed by Nazi Germany
Hungarian people executed by Nazi Germany
Executed philosophers
French male writers
French military personnel of World War II